Peter Crawley may refer to:

 Peter Crawley (boxer), (1799–1865)
 Peter Crawley (headmaster), (born 1953)
 Peter Crawley (cricketer)

See also
Crawley (surname)